Scopula ludibunda is a moth of the  family Geometridae. It is found in Zimbabwe and South Africa.

References

ludibunda
Lepidoptera of South Africa
Lepidoptera of Zimbabwe
Moths of Sub-Saharan Africa
Moths described in 1915